Contiger is a genus of moths of the family Crambidae. It contains only one species, Contiger vittatalis, which is found on North America, where it has been recorded from Florida.

The wingspan is about 15 mm. Adults have been recorded on wing in January, from March to April, from June to July and from September to October.

References

Acentropinae
Crambidae genera
Monotypic moth genera